Bruna Alberti Tomaselli (born 18 September 1997 in Caibi) is a Brazilian female racing driver. She currently competes in the W Series.

Biography
Tomaselli began her professional career in Fórmula Junior Brasil, a category comparable to Formula Ford in other countries. Following two seasons there, she would move up to Fórmula 4 Sudamericana, run to Formula Renault 1.6 regulations – where she finished fourth in her second season.

She moved to the United States in 2017, joining the Road to Indy through the U.S. F2000 National Championship. She undertook a part-time campaign initially, and signed with Team Pelfrey for a full-time campaign in 2018 – finishing 16th in the standings. Tomaselli remained in U.S. F2000 in 2019, moving to Pabst Racing Services – improving to 8th overall with a top-five finish at Mid-Ohio.

The Brazilian driver attempted to qualify for the W Series, a Formula 3 championship for female drivers, in 2019 but failed to pass the evaluation day for potential recruits. She attempted to join the championship again for 2020, and would successfully join the 20-driver field. Following the cancellation of the 2020 season, Tomaselli competed in the 2021 W Series driving for Veloce Racing, alongside eventual champion Jamie Chadwick. She managed two top-ten finishes in eight rounds, with 12 points overall, finishing 15th on the Driver's Championship.

Racing record

Career summary

Complete W Series results 
(key) (Races in bold indicate pole position) (Races in italics indicate fastest lap)

References

External links
Profile at Driver Database

Brazilian racing drivers
Brazilian people of Italian descent
1997 births
Living people
U.S. F2000 National Championship drivers
W Series drivers
Sportspeople from Santa Catarina (state)
MRF Challenge Formula 2000 Championship drivers
Team Pelfrey drivers
Formula 4 drivers
Brazilian female racing drivers